Myopopone sinensis is an extinct species of ant in the genus Myopopone. Fossils were discovered in 1989 in China, and was later described by Zhang in that year.

References

†
Insects of China
Fossil taxa described in 1989
Fossil ant taxa